Koala emblems and popular culture deals with the uses which have been made of the image of the Koala, such as coins, emblems, logos, mascots and in the naming of sports teams.

Australian emblems and logos
The Koala is the official fauna emblem of Queensland, Australia.
The Koala is the official fauna emblem for the Wildlife Preservation Society of Queensland.
Rugby union team Queensland Reds has the Koala as its logo.
Koala Corporation creates changing table that are seen in public restrooms.

United States mascots
The Koala is the official mascot of Columbia College, a women-only college in Columbia, South Carolina.
The Koala is a student newspaper at the University of California, San Diego.
 Lumpy The Koala is a mascot for WWE Super Show-Down

In popular culture
Blinky Bill is the koala star of several books, TV shows, a movie and games.
Nutsy is Blinky's friend then adopted sister in several books, TV shows, a movie and games.
Mrs. Koala is Blinky's mother in several books, TV shows, a movie.
Bunyip Bluegum is a koala in The Magic Pudding.
Buster Moon in Sing and its sequel.
Nigel an eccentric British koala in the 2006 Disney animated film The Wild.
The Australian version of the American Disney computer-animated film Zootopia has a koala as a newscaster character.
South Korean boyband BTS collaborated with Line Friends and released a set of characters called BT21; one of these characters, created by Namjoon, is a light blue koala named Koya.

TV and films
Qantas airlines used a Koala who continually complains about the airline's reliability in a series of television commercials. 
An Australian children's show has animated characters headed by The Koala Brothers.
Coojee Bear was the koala friend of Australian entertainer Rolf Harris in his 1960s UK Television shows
 In the animated series American Dad!, the character Reginald is a koala who was originally a homeless man that had his mind swapped with a koala in a CIA experiment.
In the episode "Pranksters" of the Nickelodeon animated series Rocko's Modern Life, the tannoy at the airport suggests the name of the airline is called Koala Airlines.
An airline of the same name was used in Anchorman 2: The Legend Continues.
The Cartoon Network series We Bare Bears features a koala character named Nom Nom.

Games
Koala Lumpur: Journey to the Edge is a PC game with a koala as the main character.
The Guru from Sly 3: Honor Among Thieves is an aboriginal guru Koala who is Murray's dreamtime teacher, as well as one of the new recruited members of the Cooper Gang.
Koala Kong appears as a boss in Crash Bandicoot and as a playable character in Crash Bash.
The Pokémon Komala, introduced in Pokémon Sun and Moon, is based on a koala.
The Noboru Koara, introduced in Inazuma Eleven, is based on a koala.

Other
 Release 9.10 of the Ubuntu operating system (codenamed Karmic Koala), a distribution of Linux.
Caramello Koalas are a popular Australian chocolate.
In the United States, a talking Koala in a racing firesuit is paired with Tasmanian race car driver Marcos Ambrose in commercials for Little Debbie snack cakes. The commercials take place in front of or in the #21 Little Debbie Ford Fusion from Wood Brothers Racing.
Kid Koala is the stage name of the Canadian DJ Eric San.
"Koala Infestation" is one of the more popular bits performed by comedian Mitch Hedberg.
 During the Vietnam War, conscripted Australian soldiers were derisively called "Koala soldiers" by regular army personnel.  The rationale behind this name was that they were 'not to be exported or shot at.'  It is now commonplace within the civilian population to use this nickname to refer to any deployment of troops with restricted rules of engagement.
In Terry Pratchett's book The Last Continent, there is a description of a koala-like animal referred to as the "drop-bear."

References 

Australian culture
Mammals in popular culture
Sports mascots
Emblems and popular culture